Lebachacanthus is a genus of extinct Xenacanthid shark known from the early Permian. During the late Paleozoic, xenacanths ruled the freshwater swamps and bogs of the world, preying on small amphibian-like animals.

Paleobiology

Lebachacanthus patrolled both fresh and marine waters, possibly preying on larvae of the temnospondyli and Acanthodians. The genus displays sexually dimorphic features; females had longer fin spines than males. Histological and biometric analyses of the spines of specimens provides information on the development and age at death of the fish and the environmental conditions in which they lived.

Description
Like most other xenacanthids, this genus possessed an array of spines arising from the dorsal fins. The genus is often confused with the similar genus Orthacanthus; the two genera belong to entirely separate families. The teeth of this shark were multi-cusped, with the central cusp flanked by two sharp accessory "tines" on which its prey would be impaled and trapped, in preparation for being swallowed whole. It had an abundance of pectoral fins, two next to the head, two in the middle, one near the end, and one under the caudal fin.

References

Further reading
 

Permian sharks